is a Japanese footballer who plays for Mito HollyHock.

Club statistics
Updated to 23 February 2018.

References

External links
Profile at Matsumoto Yamaga 
Profile at Zweigen Kanazawa

1995 births
Living people
Association football people from Ōita Prefecture
Japanese footballers
J1 League players
J2 League players
J3 League players
Fukushima United FC players
Zweigen Kanazawa players
Shonan Bellmare players
Matsumoto Yamaga FC players
Mito HollyHock players
Association football midfielders